Craig Watson (born 13 February 1995) is a Scottish professional footballer who plays as a defender or midfielder for Airdrieonians.

Career
Watson moved from Park Villa in Govan to Hamilton Academical as a youth player. He signed a professional contract with the club in 2012, and made his senior debut on 28 April 2012, in a 5–1 defeat against Ross County in the Scottish First Division, just a year after suffering a potentially career-threatening injury. In April 2013, Watson signed a two-year extension to his contract. In April 2015 he signed a new contract with the club, until the summer of 2017.

In September 2015, Watson moved on loan to Arbroath until January 2016. This loan spell was later extended until the end of the season.

Watson left Hamilton at the end of the 2016–17 season. He then signed for East Fife. Watson made his debut for the club in the League Cup against Peterhead on 15 July 2017. He signed a new contract with the club in June 2018  and departed in May 2021 for Airdrieonians.

Career statistics

References

1995 births
Living people
Scottish footballers
People from Fraserburgh
Footballers from Glasgow
Hamilton Academical F.C. players
Arbroath F.C. players
Scottish Football League players
Association football midfielders
Scottish Professional Football League players
East Fife F.C. players
Footballers from Aberdeenshire
Airdrieonians F.C. players